Goble may refer to:

People 
 Brian Roy Goble (1957–2014), Canadian singer and musician
 Carole Goble (born 1961), professor of Computer Science at the University of Manchester
 Elaine Goble (born 1956), Canadian visual artist
 George H. Goble, staff member at Purdue University
 Graeham Goble (born 1947), Australian singer-songwriter, founder of Little River Band
 Jonathan Goble, an American Baptist minister and missionary
 Les Goble (born 1932), American football player
 Paul Goble (1933–2017), award-winning author and illustrator of children's books
 Paul A. Goble (born 1949), American analyst, writer and columnist
 Robert Goble (1903–1991), English harpsichord builder
 Stanley Goble (1891–1948), senior commander in the Royal Australian Air Force
 Steve Goble (born 1960), retired English footballer
 Tony Goble (1943–2007), Welsh artist
 Warwick Goble (1862–1943), Victorian illustrator of children's books

Places

United States 
 Goble, Oregon
 Gobles, Michigan

South Africa 
 Goble Park, a stadium in Bethlehem, South Africa